

References 

NFL on NBC pregame show panelists
Pregame show panelists
NBC pregame show panelists